The Guertler House is a historic house located at 101 Blair St. in Alton, Illinois. Stonemason Ignaz Bruch built the house in 1854. Bruch, who immigrated to the United States from Germany in 1846, was a prominent Illinois stonemason who constructed buildings in cities ranging from Chicago to St. Louis, Missouri. The Guertler House is a Federal building with three bays. The front door and windows have a pointed arch design, while the second story of the house's west side has a single Gothic arch window.

The house was added to the National Register of Historic Places on July 30, 1974.

References

Houses on the National Register of Historic Places in Illinois
Federal architecture in Illinois
Houses completed in 1854
National Register of Historic Places in Madison County, Illinois
Houses in Madison County, Illinois